También Yo (English: So am I or So do I) is the first studio album by the Mexican pop singer Daniela Romo. It was released in 1979 and re-issued in 1985. All of the songs were composed by Lolita de la Colina and arrangements and direction were by Chucho Ferrer.

History
Daniela Romo recorded the album with CBS Records. When this label wanted to promote its release, Romo was totally committed to the shooting of the telenovela El Enemigo with Televisa. She earned more popularity because of the soap opera, so CBS tried to promote the album again, but Romo was hired to act as the main heroine in No Temas al Amor and once again the promotion was canceled. All this was a strategy by Televisa who did not like the content of the album, wanting something different for one of its exclusive artists. In 1985, CBS decided to re-issue the album as Te Pareces Mucho a Mí (You seem so much to me).

Track listing

1979 tracks
 También yo
 Todo pasa
 A saber
 Tratando de hacerme feliz
 Canción para tu alcoba
 Que tengas un buen día
 Te pareces mucho a mí
 El mejor de mis amores
 Que inocente fui
 Poca cosa

1985 tracks
 Tratando de hacerme feliz
 Qué inocente fui
 Todo pasa
 Canción para tu alcoba
 A saber
 Te pareces mucho a mí
 También yo
 Poca cosa
 Que tengas un buen día
 El mejor de mis amores

References

1979 albums
Daniela Romo albums